Fontaines may refer to the following places in France:

Fontaines, Saône-et-Loire, in the Saône-et-Loire département 
Fontaines, Vendée, in the Vendée département 
Fontaines, Yonne, in the Yonne département 
Fontaines-d'Ozillac, in the Charente-Maritime département
Fontaines-en-Duesmois, in the Côte-d'Or département
Fontaines-en-Sologne, in the Loir-et-Cher département
Fontaines-les-Sèches, in the Côte-d'Or département
Fontaines-Saint-Clair, in the Meuse département
Fontaines-Saint-Martin, in the Rhône département
Fontaines-sur-Marne, in the Haute-Marne département
Fontaines-sur-Saône, in the Rhône département
Grandchamps-des-Fontaines, in the Loire-Atlantique département
Nouans-les-Fontaines, in the Indre-et-Loire département
Pernes-les-Fontaines, in the Vaucluse département
Perrogney-les-Fontaines, in the Haute-Marne département
Saint-Génis-des-Fontaines, in the Pyrénées-Orientales département
Saint-Malo-des-Trois-Fontaines, in the Morbihan département
Saint-Martin-des-Fontaines, in the Vendée département
Trois-Fontaines-l'Abbaye, in the Marne département

Fontaines is the name or part of the name of the following municipalities in Switzerland:
Fontaines, Switzerland, canton of Neuchâtel
Fontaines-sur-Grandson, canton of Vaud, Switzerland
Fontaines, former name of Irish rock band Fontaines D.C.

See also
 Fontaine (disambiguation)